Violation is a 2020 Canadian horror drama film directed and written by Madeleine Sims-Fewer and Dusty Mancinelli. It is the feature film debut of the two directors, who have collaborated on several short films displayed at film festivals worldwide. The film stars Madeleine Sims-Fewer, Anna Maguire, Jesse LaVercombe, Obi Abili, Jasmin Geljo, and Cynthia Ashperger.

The film premiered at the 2020 Toronto International Film Festival. It had its US premiere at the 2021 Sundance Film Festival on February 1, 2021.

Synopsis
"A traumatic betrayal drives a woman towards a vengeful extremity."

A woman embarks on a campaign of revenge after she is sexually assaulted by her brother-in-law and not believed by her sister.

Plot 
Miriam and her husband Caleb drive towards her sister Greta's cabin, where the two act uneasy with each other. At the cabin, the two spend time with Greta and her husband Dylan. Later, Dylan and Miriam hike through the forest until the two set up camp for the night.

In the present, Greta and Miriam act distant towards each other. As Greta is stressed by not preparing for Dylan's family gathering, Miriam offers to help make ice cream for her sister. With Greta outside preparing tables, Miriam pulls out a jar of an unknown substance from her bag to add to the mix.

In another moment in the past, Miriam meets Dylan at the cabin under the pretense of sleeping with her. Convincing Dylan to strip naked and being blindfolded, Miriam asks Dylan about what it felt like when he assaulted her before knocking him unconscious.

As Dylan and Miriam set up camp, the two talk about Miriam's dreams before she kisses Dylan. The next morning, Dylan assaults Miriam while she remains asleep, waking up and begging him to stop. Miriam walks back to the cabin on her own.

After knocking Dylan unconscious, Miriam bounds Dylan to a chair as she prepares to kill him. After hearing a boat passing by, Miriam duct-tapes the blindfold before wrapping a plastic bag around Dylan's head. Dylan begins to suffocate, forcing Miriam to tear the bag open as Dylan headbutts her. He breaks free from his restraints as Miriam struggles against him, leading her to choke Dylan. Miriam cries at killing Dylan before burning the body.

In the past, Miriam returns, climbing into bed with Caleb. Attempting to sleep with Caleb, he rebuffs her as he walks out of the room. Seeing the three on the docks, Miriam attempts to free a rabbit before encountering Dylan. Miriam confronts Dylan only for him to deny all responsibility, reasoning that she wanted to be assaulted.

After choking Dylan, Miriam hangs Dylan's body upside-down as his blood drips into a cooler below. She fills containers with Dylan's blood and dismembers Dylan's corpse, scrubbing all traces of evidence from the cabin. Miriam dyes her hair before arriving at a motel, encountering a couple arguing outside. In the motel bathroom, Miriam pours the blood down the bathtub drain while flushing blood-soaked rags in the toilet.

As Miriam and Greta swim in the lake, Miriam informs Greta of Dylan assaulting her. Greta refuses to believe Miriam, causing Miriam to swim back to shore in anger. Miriam later argues with Greta skinning a rabbit, causing Caleb to leave out of embarrassment. The scene shifts back to Miriam grinding Dylan's bones to dust, placing them into the jar shown earlier. 

In the present, Miriam and Greta discuss Miriam's dream, to which Greta tells Miriam that she still loves her. At the family gathering, Miriam looks at everyone, unaware of Dylan's fate.

Cast
The cast include:
 Madeleine Sims-Fewer as Miriam
 Anna Maguire as Greta
 Jesse LaVercombe as Dylan
 Obi Abili as Caleb
 Jasmin Geljo as Ivan
 Cynthia Ashperger as Jelena

Production
Deepa Mehta, whom Mancinelli had worked for as an assistant, served as executive producer, along with David Hamilton, François Dagenais and David James.

Release
The film had its world premiere at the 2020 Toronto International Film Festival in the section Midnight Madness on September 14, 2020. The film also premiered at the 2021 Sundance Film Festival on February 1, 2021, in the Midnight section. In December 2020, streaming service Shudder announced it had purchased streaming rights for the film. It was released on Shudder on March 25, 2021.

Chronological festival summary list:

 Toronto International Film Festival 2020 (world premiere)
 Festival du Nouveau Cinéma
 Vancouver International Film Festival
 Calgary International Film Festival
 Saskatoon Fantastic Film Festival
 Sundance Film Festival 2021 (international premiere)
 Victoria Film Festival
 SXSW (South by Southwest) Film Festival

Reception

Critical response 
The website's critics consensus reads, "Violation presents a powerful depiction of one woman's trauma -- and its uncomfortably gripping aftermath." Violation, which is described as "decidedly dark, potentially dangerous and probably deranged" and "flips the revenge genre on its head", was selected for the "Fantastic 7" genre festival initiative to highlight genre films at seven international film festivals. Critic Mike Crisolago has named it one of 30 films he is already "excited to see." Now Toronto critic Norman Wilner called it "a major levelling up of their signature combination of rage and intensity". According to Variety reviewer Tomris Laffley, "Despite some heavy-handed choices, Madeleine Sims-Fewer and Dusty Mancinelli pack a profound gut-punch with their debut feature."

Awards and nominations
The film received five Canadian Screen Award nominations at the 9th Canadian Screen Awards in 2021, for Best Actress (Sims-Fewer), Best Supporting Actor (LaVercombe), Best Sound Editing (Matthew Chan, Ida Marci), Best Sound Mixing (Matthew Chan) and the John Dunning Best First Feature Award.

 TIFF Rising Star - Madeleine Sims-Fewer
Emerging Canadian Artist Award - Calgary International Film Festival
 Emerging Canadian Director Award - Vancouver International Film Festival
ACTRA Awards - Outstanding Performance - Jesse LaVercombe
 Directors Guild of Canada Discovery Award (nominee)
Vancouver Film Critics Circle Awards (nominee): Best Picture, Best Director, Best Actor - Madeleine Sims-Fewer

References

External links
 
 
 

2020 films
2020s horror drama films
Canadian horror drama films
2020 horror films
Shudder (streaming service) original programming
2020 drama films
2020 directorial debut films
2020s English-language films
2020s Canadian films